Hassan Fadil (born 3 February 1962 in Taza) is a Moroccan footballer. He played for Raja Beni Mellal, RCD Mallorca and CD Málaga as well as Chateauroux and Valence in France's Second Division during his professional career.

References

 

1963 births
Living people
Moroccan footballers
Morocco international footballers
1988 African Cup of Nations players
Association football forwards
La Liga players
RCD Mallorca players
Málaga CF players
Moroccan expatriate sportspeople in Spain
Expatriate footballers in Spain
People from Fez, Morocco